The 2011 Nationwide Tour was the 22nd Nationwide Tour season. It ran from February 24 to October 30. The season consisted of 26 official money golf tournaments; three of which were played outside of the United States. The top 25 players on the year-end money list earned their PGA Tour card for 2012.

Schedule
The following table lists official events during the 2011 season.

Money leaders
For full rankings, see 2011 Nationwide Tour graduates.

The money list was based on prize money won during the season, calculated in U.S. dollars. The top 25 players on the tour earned status to play on the 2012 PGA Tour.

Awards

Notes

References

Korn Ferry Tour seasons
Nationwide Tour